Thowar Valley is a valley in the Roundu Subdivision of District Skardu, Gilgit-Baltistan, Pakistan. The valley is on the right bank of the Indus River, Pakistan's longest river, between Skardu and Gilgit city. It is the administrative center of Roundu Subdivision and all the administrative buildings; THQ hospital, Assistant Commissioner House, College and other landmarks are in the Thowar valley.

Geography 
In the east of the valley is the Tormik valley and in the west is the Stak valley and Askor Valley.In addition, on the Hamalayan side lower Talu and Upper Talu (the then Talo Broq), Gangi and Bilamik, Hango, and Harpo valleys are in the vicinity of Thowar Roundu. In the south, there is the Mandi valley and in the north, there is a mountainous region which ultimately links the valley to the upper valleys of Stak and Tormik.

References 

Baltistan
Populated places in Skardu District
Valleys of Gilgit-Baltistan